Wright City can refer to one of the following places: 

Wright City, Missouri
Wright City, Oklahoma
Wright City, Texas
Wright City, Wyoming